Lapland University of Applied Sciences (Finnish: Lapin Ammattikorkeakoulu), in short Lapland UAS (Finnish: Lapin AMK), is a Finnish polyethnic university located in the cities of Kemi, Tornio and Rovaniemi. It was founded on January 1, 2014 as a merger between Rovaniemi University of Applied Sciences and Kemi-Tornio University of Applied Sciences. The merger carried over all the features of the previous organizations in an expanded organization form.

The institution has roughly 5000 students and 500 staff working on the three campuses.

Lapland UAS has two distinct schools, the school of Northern Well-being and services, and the school of School of Arctic Natural Resources and Economy.

History 
Kemi-Tornio University of Applied Sciences was established in 1992. Rovaniemi University of Applied Sciences was established in 1996. Together with the University of Lapland, they were and the new Lapland University of Applied Sciences is part of the Lapland University Consortium.

Kemi and Tornio are situated in the Finnish Lapland, close to the Swedish border on the Gulf of Bothnia and Rovaniemi is situated further north and inland close to the arctic circle.

Study programs 
Lapland UAS offers a variety of study options for Finnish speakers in fields such as hospitality, health and welfare, communications, arts, and business administration.

For international students, Lapland UAS has five bachelor's programs taught in english, and one master's level program.

See also
List of polytechnics in Finland

References

Universities and colleges in Finland
Educational institutions established in 1992
Educational institutions established in 1996
Educational institutions established in 2014
University of Applied Sciences
University of Applied Sciences
University of Applied Sciences
Vocational education
Education in Lapland (Finland)
1992 establishments in Finland
1996 establishments in Finland
2014 establishments in Finland